Vřesina is a municipality and village in Opava District in the Moravian-Silesian Region of the Czech Republic. It has about 1,700 inhabitants. It is part of historic Hlučín Region.

History
The first written mention of Vřesina is from 1270.

Twin towns – sister cities

Vřesina is twinned with:
 Kornowac, Poland

References

External links

Villages in Opava District
Hlučín Region